Venus' hair can refer to:

In geology, fine crystals of rutile in quartz.
In horticulture, a name for ferns in the genus Adiantum.